La Guérison des Dalton is a Lucky Luke adventure written by Goscinny and illustrated by Morris. It is the forty fourth book in the series and It was originally published in French in the year 1975 and in English by Cinebook in 2010 as A Cure for the Daltons.

Synopsis 
Professor Otto Von Himbeergeist, a famed psychologist, announces that crime is a psychologically based personal inefficiency which can be cured by therapy, and he chooses the Dalton Brothers as his test subjects. The doctor takes the Daltons to a farm to be in a better environment for treatment. Lucky Luke has to watch them. Nevertheless, the Daltons escapes with the professor who rallies to them. They then resort to a special method for their robberies: Otto psychoanalyses the director of the bank who gives them the money themselves. But the treatment really worked on Averell who does not want to commit crimes anymore. Using this feature against the Daltons, Luke manages to capture the entire gang and take them to jail.

Characters 

 Otto von Himbergeist: Professor of psychology, probably Austrian. He is convinced that an event occurring in the childhood of each criminal is at the origin of the latter's shift towards crime and that he can be cured of his criminal instincts. His therapy usually comes down to listening to the patient tell the story of his early childhood. The doctor always asks people questions that lead them to talk about their past and be upset. He seems to be able to make anyone doubt: he can even disrupt Lucky Luke. Refusing to listen to Luke's recommendations, he tries to give the Daltons treatment but their lifestyle seems more attractive to him than his career as a doctor: he believes he sees his true vocation in crime and rallies to the Daltons. One of the characteristics of Otto is pride, he is proud of his brain and does not allow anyone to doubt his logic.
 The Dalton: They agree to undergo the treatment of Professor Von Himbergeist for the sole purpose of being judged cured and released from prison. Averell will be the only one on whom the treatment will work. Lucky Luke uses this weakness to defeat the doctor and the Daltons.

Cultural references
 The psychologist is a caricature of German film actor Emil Jannings.
 Near the end of the story it is hinted that the psychologist's ideas will have an influence on a little boy born in Austria around the same time. This is of course a nod to Sigmund Freud, whom the nurse even directly references when she says: "Mrs. Freud! Mrs. Freud! Just hear what little Sigi wanted to do with me!"

External links
Lucky Luke official site album index 
Goscinny website on Lucky Luke

Comics by Morris (cartoonist)
Lucky Luke albums
1975 graphic novels
Works by René Goscinny
Psychotherapy in fiction
Cultural depictions of Sigmund Freud